Kathrin Haacker (born 3 April 1967 in Wismar, Bezirk Rostock) is a German former rower, who competed for SC Dynamo Berlin. She won medals at Olympic and world championships.

References 

1967 births
Living people
People from Wismar
People from Bezirk Rostock
East German female rowers
German female rowers
Sportspeople from Mecklenburg-Western Pomerania
Olympic medalists in rowing
Medalists at the 1992 Summer Olympics
Medalists at the 1988 Summer Olympics
Olympic gold medalists for East Germany
Olympic bronze medalists for Germany
World Rowing Championships medalists for East Germany
World Rowing Championships medalists for Germany
Recipients of the Patriotic Order of Merit in gold
Recipients of the Silver Laurel Leaf
Olympic rowers of East Germany
Olympic rowers of Germany
Rowers at the 1988 Summer Olympics
Rowers at the 1992 Summer Olympics
Rowers at the 1996 Summer Olympics